The 1999 African Youth Championship was the tenth edition of the continental Under-20 football competition, held in Ghana. It also served as qualification for the 1999 FIFA World Youth Championship.

Qualification

Preliminary round
Gambia and Namibia withdrew before playing. As a result, Burkina Faso and Malawi advanced to the next round. Mauritania withdrew after one match and Libya went through.

|}

First round
Burkina Faso withdrew before playing. As a result, Nigeria advanced to the next round.

|}

Second round

|}

Teams
The following teams qualified for tournament:

 
 
  (host)

Group stage

Group A

Group B

Knock-out stage

Fifth-place Match

Semi-finals

Third place match

Final

Further information

Assistant Referees: 
 Carlos Henriques
Tomusange Ali 
 Monteiro Duarte

Cautions:
 Kofi Amoako 
 Aminu Sani
 Sunday Adu 
 Sam Okoye 

Line-ups

Qualification to World Youth Championship
The five best performing teams qualified for the 1999 FIFA World Youth Championship.

 
 
 
  (host)

External links
Tournament details at Rsssf

Africa U-20 Cup of Nations
Youth
Africa
1999
1999 in youth association football